Formel is the word for "formula" in many languages.

In English and German, it may more specifically refer to:

 The Formel (unit), an English unit of weight]]
 Formel (Stockhausen), a 1951 composition by Karlheinz Stockhausen